Melobasina is a genus of beetles in the family Buprestidae, containing the following species:

 Melobasina apicalis Kerremans, 1900
 Melobasina fossicollis (Kerremans, 1906)
 Melobasina riedeli Kuban & Bily, 2010
 Melobasina solomonensis (Thery, 1937)
 Melobasina suturalis (Deyrolle, 1864)

References

Buprestidae genera